Luitpold may refer to:

 Luitpold, Margrave of Bavaria (died 907), European ruler
 Luitpold, Prince Regent of Bavaria (1821–1912), Knight of the Golden Fleece
 Prince Luitpold of Bavaria (b. 1951), CEO of König Ludwig GmbH & Co. KG Schlossbrauerei Kaltenberg
 SMS Prinzregent Luitpold, a Kaiser class battleship
 Luitpold Coast
 Luitpold Gymnasium

See also
 Leopold (disambiguation)

Masculine given names
German masculine given names